In the Church of Jesus Christ of Latter-day Saints (LDS Church), a temple is a building dedicated to be a House of the Lord. Temples are considered by church members to be the most sacred structures on earth.

Upon completion, temples are usually open to the public for a short period of time (an "open house"). During the open house, the church conducts tours of the temple with missionaries and members from the local area serving as tour guides, and all rooms of the temple are open to the public. The temple is then dedicated as a "House of the Lord", after which only members who are deemed worthy are permitted entrance.

Temples are not churches or meetinghouses designated for public weekly worship services, but rather are places of worship open only to the faithful where certain rites of the church must be performed.

  There are temples in many U.S. states, as well as in many countries across the world. Several temples are at historical sites of the LDS Church, such as Nauvoo, Illinois, Palmyra, New York, and Salt Lake City, Utah. The importance of temples is often emphasized in weekly meetings, and regular participation in "temple work" is strongly encouraged for all Latter-day Saints (LDS).

Within temples, members of the church make covenants, receive instructions, and perform sacred ceremonies and ordinances, such as baptism for the dead, washing and anointing (or "initiatory" ordinances), the endowment, and  eternal marriage sealings. Ordinances are a vital part of the theology of the church, which teaches that they were practiced by the Lord's covenant people in all dispensations. Additionally, members consider the temple a place to commune with God, seek God's aid, understand the will of God, and receive personal revelation.

History

Biblical references

Likewise the Tabernacle was considered a "portable temple" by the children of Israel in the Old Testament.

Latter-day temples
The first Latter-day Saint temple ceremonies were performed in Kirtland, Ohio, but differed significantly from the endowment performed on the second floor of Joseph Smith's Red Brick Store in Nauvoo, Illinois, and the Nauvoo Temple. Kirtland ordinances included washings and anointings (differing in many ways from the modern portion) and the washing of the feet ordinance. For nearly four years, beginning in 1842, Smith's Red Brick Store functioned as a de facto temple—the site of the first washings, anointings, endowments, and sealings. In contrast, the grand edifice known as the Nauvoo Temple was in operation for only two months before the Latter Day Saints left Illinois for the West.

Preparations to initiate the first members of Smith's Quorum of the Anointed, or Holy Order, as it was also known, were made on May 3, 1842. The walls of the second level of the Red Brick Store were painted with garden-themed murals, the rooms fitted with carpets, potted plants, and a veil hung from the ceiling. All the while, the ground level continued to operate as Smith’s general mercantile.

After the early events of the succession crisis, Brigham Young assumed control of the church's headquarters at Nauvoo, Illinois. While he and the rest of the Quorum of the Twelve made contingency plans for abandoning the city, he may have hoped that it would not prove necessary. For example, in early 1845, Young convened a conference at the Norwegian colony at Norway, Illinois, and announced a plan to build a Latter-day Saint town there with a temple for the use of the Norwegian Latter Day Saints.

Meanwhile, Young urged the Latter-day Saints in Nauvoo to redouble their efforts to finish the temple. By the end of 1845, the building was sufficiently finished to allow temple ordinances to be performed. Ordinances continued to be performed in early 1846 as the Mormons were forced to abandon the city. A small crew remained in the city and continued to work on the temple until April 30, 1846, when it was formally dedicated in a private ceremony by Joseph Young, the senior of the Seven Presidents of the Seventy. It was used for three months, then abandoned in late summer 1846. The completed temple was eventually destroyed by fire, and the remaining structure was later demolished by a whirlwind.

Upon reaching the Great Basin, Brigham Young began to build settlements based on the City of Zion plan and designated four of these to contain temples: Salt Lake City (1847), St. George (1871), Manti (1875), and Logan (1877). The St. George Temple was the first to be completed in 1877, followed by Logan (1884) and Manti (1888). The Salt Lake Temple took 40 years to complete because of various setbacks and delays. It was dedicated in 1893.

Latter-day Saint temple building halted until the presidency of Joseph F. Smith, who announced two additional temples: Cardston, Alberta (1913), and Lā, Hawaii (1915). Cardston became the first Latter-day Saint temple dedicated outside of the United States. Smith broke with the previous tradition (established since Kirtland) of building temples with upper and lower courts. Temples previously had been ever larger, but the Laie Hawaii Temple was smaller than the Nauvoo Temple had been.

Both Cardston and Laie were dedicated under church president Heber J. Grant, as was a temple in Mesa, Arizona. George Albert Smith dedicated the next temple in Idaho Falls, Idaho. David O. McKay dedicated five additional temples including one in Bern, Switzerland—which was the first temple dedicated in Europe and the first temple to use film recording of the endowment rather than live actors. Joseph Fielding Smith dedicated a temple in Ogden, Utah and Harold B. Lee dedicated its twin in Provo, Utah.

Spencer W. Kimball began a plan to build many more smaller temples according to standardized plans. Twenty-one temples were dedicated during his presidency, including the tiny Papeete Tahiti Temple—which has a floorspace of less than 10,000 square feet (900 m²). This trend has continued. Nine additional temples were dedicated in the presidency of Ezra Taft Benson and two in the brief presidency of Howard W. Hunter.

Under church president Gordon B. Hinckley, the church dedicated 77 temples. In 1997, Hinckley introduced a standardized, smaller temple plan designed to bring temple services to smaller or remote congregations at a reduced cost. The first of this new generation of temples was completed in 1998 with the Monticello Utah Temple. Subsequent revisions to the standard design further increased the size and complexity of the temples. The majority of the temples dedicated under Hinckley's tenure were of the smaller design, but one particularly noteworthy achievement was the rebuilding of the temple in Nauvoo, Illinois, known as the Nauvoo Illinois Temple.

Hinckely's successor, Thomas S. Monson, dedicated 26 temples during his time as church president.  His counselors in the First Presidency also dedicated a number of temples during Monson's administration.

As of October 2018, Monson's successor, Russell M. Nelson, has dedicated the Concepción Chile Temple.

Purposes
Temples have a different purpose from LDS meetinghouses. They serve two main purposes: (1) Temples are locations in which worthy Latter-day Saints can perform sacred ordinances on behalf of themselves, their deceased ancestors, or unrelated deceased persons whose names are compiled from historical records through the church's Family Record Extraction Program. (2) Temples are considered to be houses of holiness where members can go to commune with God and more easily receive personal revelation.

Symbolism in the temple

Many things in the temple are considered to be symbolic, from the clothing worn (those who attend the temple dress in white, a symbol of purity), to the architecture of the building and rooms, to the ceremonies themselves.

Latter-day Saint temples are constructed with several symbolic elements meant to represent their religious theology. Each temple has the words "Holiness to the Lord" inscribed on it, the same inscription on the Old Testament Temple of Solomon.

Most temples are built facing east, the direction from which Jesus Christ is prophesied to return. The spires and towers on the east end of multi-spired temples are elevated higher than spires and towers on the west side for this same reason, and to represent the Melchizedek, or higher, priesthood.

Some temples, such as Salt Lake, Chicago, and Washington D.C., have triple spires on each side of the temple representing three different offices in both the Melchizedek and Aaronic priesthood.

Stones carved with sun, moon, and earth or star designs are placed in ascending order around the Salt Lake Temple façade to represent the Latter-day Saint belief in a celestial, terrestrial, and telestial kingdom, or three degrees of glory, in the afterlife. However, they are arranged using the description of the woman found in Revelation 12:1 which says "And there appeared a great wonder in heaven; a woman clothed with the sun, and the moon under her feet, and upon her head a crown of twelve stars."

A statue of the Angel Moroni, stands atop many temples built after the Salt Lake Temple. The statue design represents the Latter-day Saint belief that Moroni was the angel spoken of in Revelation 14.

Temple ordinances

LDS Church members perform rituals (termed ordinances) within temples. They are taught that temple ordinances are essential to achieving the condition of exaltation after the final judgment. They are also taught that a vast number of dead souls exist in a condition termed as spirit prison, and that a dead individual upon whom the temple ordinances are completed will have a chance to be freed of this imprisoning condition. In this framework ordinances are said to be completed on behalf of either the participant, or a dead individual the same sex as the participant ("on behalf of the dead" or "by proxy").

Ordinances performed in the temple include:
 Baptism and confirmation on behalf of the dead
 Melchizedek priesthood ordination on behalf of deceased men
 Washing and anointing (also known as the "Initiatory" ordinances)
 The endowment
 sealing ordinances (for opposite-sex couples and for parents and their children)

Most ordinances are performed by proxy only on participants who have already completed the ordinance. Similarly, most ordinances are completed only one time for a participant in a lifetime and all subsequent temple ordinance participation is seen as acting for a dead individual. Baptism, confirmation, and priesthood ordination are usually performed in temples only when on behalf of the dead. The initiatory, endowment, and sealing ceremonies are today performed only within a temple.

The sealing ordinance can be performed on behalf of dead couples; so long as the two living participants are of opposite sex they need not be married. It is also performed on behalf of living couples who wish to be legally married. In this manner, the ordinance is typically performed as a celestial marriage, with the idea the marriage bond lasts after their death, or for "time and all eternity". A "time only" modification can be made to the ordinance, such as when the surviving widow of a celestial marriage wishes to legally remarry. If children were born to the couple prior to the couple's sealing ceremony, the parents and the children may also be sealed together to form an eternal family unit. Children born to a couple after the sealing ceremony are considered to be automatically sealed to the parents, or "born in the covenant".

In addition to the ordinances listed above, 19th-century temples were host to other ordinances that are no longer practiced such as the baptism for health and baptism for renewal of covenants. In 1922, Heber J. Grant discontinued the practice of baptisms for health in the church. The second anointing is a rare, but currently practiced ordinance for live participants, and (less commonly) vicariously for deceased individuals, though, it is usually only given in absolute secrecy to a small number of members after a lifetime of service.

Entrance requirements

The LDS Church booklet "Preparing to Enter the Holy Temple" explains that Latter-day Saints "do not discuss the temple ordinances outside the temples."

To enter the temple, an individual must be baptized, and after one year, may seek a temple recommend, which authorizes admission to the temple. The person is interviewed by their bishop, during which the candidate is asked a series of questions to determine worthiness to enter the temple. The individual is also interviewed by his or her stake president. The bishop and stake president sign the recommend, indicating their approval of that member's worthiness. The individual also signs the recommend, acknowledging the responsibility to remain worthy to hold the recommend. Most recommends are valid for two years.

Worthiness interview

To qualify for a temple recommend, an LDS Church member must faithfully answer the following questions which affirm the individual's adherence to essential church doctrine:

 Faith in and testimony of God the Father, Jesus Christ, and the Holy Ghost.
 Testimony of the atonement of Jesus Christ and his role as personal Savior and Redeemer.
 Testimony of the restoration of the gospel.
 Support of the President of the Church and his authority, and other general authorities and local church leaders.
 Moral cleanliness in thoughts and actions.
 Obeying the law of chastity.
 Following teachings of the church in public and private behavior with family members and others.
 Refraining from supporting or promoting any teaching, practice, or doctrine that conflicts with those of the church. 
 Making a good faith effort to keep the Sabbath Day holy; attend meetings; prepare for and worthily partake of the sacrament; live life in accordance with the laws and commandments of the gospel.
 Honesty in everything.
 Paying a full tithe.
 Understanding and obeying the Word of Wisdom.
 Payment of and keeping current on child support or alimony, if applicable.
 If already received the endowment, keeping the covenants made in the temple and wearing the temple garment as instructed in the temple.
 Making a full confession of any serious sins to church leaders.
 Regarding oneself worthy to enter the temple and participate in ordinances therein.

History of interview questions
A list of questions were first introduced in 1857 and used to qualify whether an individual could enter the Endowment House, before the first temple in Utah was built. They reflected the context of the times, including questions about branding an animal that you did not own and using another person's irrigation water.

Since then, the temple recommend questions have changed significantly, though less so in recent years.

 In 1996, the first question about a belief in God, Jesus Christ, and the Holy Ghost was split into three questions. A second question was modified to ask if the member sustained the First Presidency and Quorum of the Twelve as prophets, seers, and revelators. The question about wearing the garments was qualified, added a clause about wearing them as instructed in the temple. 
 In 1999, a simplified question about financial obligations was asked of all members, not just divorced members. 
 In 2012, the question about wearing the garments was slightly modified to clarify that the garments should not be worn separately.
 In October 2019's general conference, church president Russell M. Nelson announced revisions to the temple recommend questions. In addition to some clarifications and streamlining, the question about the law of chastity now includes "striving for moral cleanliness" in thoughts and behavior. The question about attending church meetings was expanded to include a more general question about Sabbath observance.

Types of recommends
The standard temple recommend authorizes a member who has been baptized at least one year prior to take part in all temple ordinances and is valid for two years.

A recommend for living ordinances is given to individuals who are participating in the endowment for the first time, being sealed to a spouse, or anyone being married in the temple for time only. It may only be used in conjunction with a standard temple recommend.

A limited-use recommend is available to members who have not yet received their endowment or who have not been a member for one year. These may also be issued to a group for a single visit to the temple. These can be issued to youth 11 and older who will take part in baptism and confirmations for the dead, to single members age 8–20 who are preparing to be sealed to their parents, or for individuals, not endowed, who wish to observe specific ordinances. The church member must meet the same worthiness standards as a standard temple recommend in an interview with the member's bishop. Unlike the standard temple recommend, a limited-use recommend does not require a year's membership nor an interview with a stake president. A limited-use recommend is only valid for proxy baptisms and confirmation ordinances. A limited use recommend is valid for one year.

Emergency access
Those without recommends occasionally need to enter temples after dedication during fires, medical emergencies, or building inspections. They are escorted by temple personnel during such visits. Temples may offer introductory tours to new local firefighters and emergency medical technicians during regularly scheduled maintenance periods.

Temple weddings

The LDS temple wedding is a process which culminates in the participation by the couple in a ritual called the sealing ordinance; which involves pronouncing the couple as having a permanent marriage bond which persists even beyond death. This ceremony, among others, is taught as being vital to an individual's and family's exaltation status, following the final judgment.

With the sealing ordinance being held inside a temple, only church members in good standing who have a valid  temple recommend are permitted to attend the ceremony. In many nations outside the United States, a civil ceremony, where required by the law of the land, has been immediately followed by a temple sealing. In the United States, a one-year waiting period between the civil ceremony and a temple sealing was required until 2019.

In May 2019, to standardize sealing policies on a global scale, church leaders announced an end to the one-year waiting period in most cases, except in relation to converts to the church, who are still required to wait a year after their own confirmation before entering the temple.

Receptions after the temple ceremony, or engagement parties before the temple marriage, can be attended by anyone, since they are typically held at locations such as local LDS meetinghouses, homes, other churches, or other public venues.

See also

 Council House (Salt Lake City)
 Endowment House
 Holy of Holies (LDS Church)
 List of temples of The Church of Jesus Christ of Latter-day Saints
 Temple president
 Mormonism and Freemasonry

Notes

References

 
 
 
 Monesees, Laurie Smith, The Temple: Dedicated to Peace, Herald House: 1993.
 
 
 
 Speek, Vickie Cleverley. "God Has Made Us a Kingdom" James Strang and the Midwest Mormon. Signature Books.
 
 
 .
 "The Temple" British Broadcasting BBC, 2005-11-09. Article on Mormon temple worship from BBC Religion & Ethics website, last accessed 2006-09-19.

Further reading

 Cowan, Richard O., Temples to Dot the Earth, January 1997, 

 
 

 Packer, Boyd K., The Holy Temple, June 1980, 
 
 

 Talmage, James E., The House of the Lord Signature Books (reprint of the first edition)

External links

 Official LDS Church Temples Site
 ChurchofJesusChristTemples.org website

Genealogy and the Church of Jesus Christ of Latter-day Saints
Latter Day Saint practices
 

de:Tempel der Kirche Jesu Christi der Heiligen der Letzten Tage
es:Templo (SUD)
fr:Temple de l'Église de Jésus-Christ des saints des derniers jours